Mal Kennedy may refer to:

 Malcolm Kennedy, a fictional character from the Australian soap opera Neighbours
 Malcolm Kennedy (footballer) (1892–1918), Australian rules footballer